Marlborough Street railway station is a former railway station in the western Adelaide suburb of Henley Beach.

History 

The station opened in 1894, and was on the former Henley Beach railway. Facilities consisted of a single platform and probably a shelter shed.

It closed on 31 August 1957, and the station has since been demolished.

See also 
 List of closed Adelaide railway stations

Disused railway stations in South Australia
Railway stations in Australia opened in 1894
Railway stations closed in 1957
Demolished buildings and structures in South Australia
Demolished railway stations